"Reisebriefe von Hermann Raster: mit einer Biographie und einem Bildniss des Verfassers" is a biography and collection of travel essays by German-American editor and politician Hermann Raster. It was published posthumously in 1891. The novel was accredited to its subject and the author of the essays, Hermann Raster, though the introduction and biographer remain unknown. The essays chronicle the life travels and experiences of Raster, who was a Forty-Eighter best known for being Editor-in-Chief of the Illinois Staats-Zeitung and Collector of Internal Revenue for the First Illinois District. He was a correspondent for several German newspapers in America and an ardent abolitionist before and during the American Civil War.

References

American literature in immigrant languages
German books
Biographies (books)